Conan I (died 27 June 992) nicknamed Le Tort (The Crooked) was the Duke of Brittany from 990 to his death.

Life

Count to Duke
Conan was the son of Judicael Berengar, succeeding his father as Count of Rennes in 970.

Conan assumed the title of Duke of Brittany in the spring of 990 following his attack on Nantes and the subsequent death of Count Alan.

As Duke, his rule succeeded the Regency that governed Brittany during the life of Drogo and the fractured rule of Brittany after Drogo's death by his illegitimate brothers Hoël and Guerech, and the latter's son Alan.

The fractured rule over Brittany resulted in a short vacancy in the title Duke of Brittany. Conan I had to ally himself with Odo I, Count of Blois in order to defeat Judicael Berengar before he could assume the title of Duke.

The Mont St Michel land charter
In a charter dated 28 July 990, Conan gave the lands of Villamée, Lillele and Passille to Mont Saint-Michel, all of which later became part of the seigneury of Fougères.

Marriage alliance
Conan married Ermengarde-Gerberga of Anjou, in 973, daughter of Geoffrey I, Count of Anjou and Adele of Vermandois.

Conan's alliance with Odo of Blois  had helped him defeat Judicael Berengar.

Norman Pact
The alliance with Blois eventually became troublesome and he later needed to "rid himself of influence from Blois, [which he accomplished by signing] a pact with Richard I of Normandy; [this pact] established firm Breton-Norman links for the first time."

Richard I had married the daughter of Hugh I the Great, and after this marriage had re-asserted his father's claim as Overlord of the Breton duchy.  Conan I's pact with Normandy strengthened that assertion but the historical documentation for that Overlordship claim remains doubtful because it largely appears only in the less than authoritative writings of Dudo of Saint-Quentin.

Death
Conan died fighting his brother-in-law Fulk Nerra, Count of Anjou at the Battle of Conquereuil on 27 June 992. Conan is buried at Mont Saint-Michel Abbey.

Family
Conan and his wife Ermengarde-Gerberga had:

Geoffrey (c. 980–1008), the eventual heir.
Judith (982–1017), married Richard II, Duke of Normandy.
Judicael, count of Porhoët (died 1037).
Hernod.
 Catuallon, Abbot of Redon

See also
Counts of Rennes
Dukes of Brittany
Dukes of Brittany family tree

Notes

References

Bibliography

Conan I, Duke of Brittany
10th-century dukes of Brittany
Dukes of Brittany
Counts of Rennes
Conan I, Duke of Brittany
Year of birth unknown